Eugene Wilson may refer to:

 W. Eugene Wilson (1929–2015), Republican member of the North Carolina General Assembly
 Eugene McLanahan Wilson (1833–1890), U.S. Representative for Minnesota, 1869–1871
 Eugene T. Wilson (1852–1925), American politician in the state of Washington
 Eugene Wilson (English footballer) (1932–2006)
 Eugene Wilson (American football) (born 1980), NFL football player 
 Gene Wilson (American football) (1926–2002), NFL football player